Mananjary is a city on the East coast of Madagascar with a population of 25,222 inhabitants in 2018.
It is the chief town of the Mananjary district and the Vatovavy region.

It contains a town of the same name, situated on the southern part of the east coast, where the Mananjary River flows into the Indian Ocean. There's a small port and an airport.

Mananjary is situated at 130 km south of Nosy Varika on the RN 11 and 167 km north of Manakara by the National road 12 and National road 25.
The Canal des Pangalanes divides the town into two sections.  

In 2022 Cyclone Batsirai made landfall at Mananjary, leaving the city destroyed by 90%.

Economy
Agriculture production is focused on vanilla, coffee, and pepper production.

Roads
National road 24 - Mananjary - Vohilava, Mananjary (intersection with RN11)
National road 25 - leading inlands (westwards) to RN7 and Fianarantsoa.
National road 11 - Northwards from Mananjary to Nosy Varika.
National road 12 - Southwards, to Manakara

Religion
It is the seat of the Roman Catholic Diocese of Mananjary.

The small Antambahoaka tribe holds a ceremonial mass circumcision rite every seven years in the village, called "Sambatra."

Education 
 École primaire française de Mananjary

References

Cities in Madagascar
Populated places in Vatovavy
Regional capitals in Madagascar